Seymour Shaw Park is a football (soccer) stadium in Miranda, New South Wales, Australia. It is the current home ground of the Sutherland Sharks Football Club who play in the state league, the New South Wales Premier League.

History
Seymour Shaw Park has been the Sharks home ground since the club's move from Sutherland Oval in the late '50s. The ground has continuously been used to host regular season club games along with hosting the TigerTurf Cup, similar to England's FA Cup, with the Grand Final being played at the ground due to the surface being Synthetic which is supplied by TigerTurf Accessories.

In recent times, the Sharks invested into Seymour Shaw Park to upgrade the facilities with additional seating in a new grandstand, upgrading of floodlighting and the installation of the synthetic turf, being completed in February 2007. It is both the first approved football field of any code and first FIFA approved field in Australia.

References

Soccer venues in Sydney
Sports venues in Sydney
Sutherland Sharks FC
1950 establishments in Australia
Sports venues completed in 1950
A-League Women stadiums
Sydney FC (A-League Women)